Russell E. Ruderman is an American politician and was a Democratic member of the Hawaii Senate from 2012 to 2020 representing District 2.

Education
Born to a Jewish family, Ruderman earned his BS in biology from Pennsylvania State University.

Elections
2012 With Democratic Senator Gil Kahele redistricted to District 1, Ruderman won the District 2 four-way August 11, 2012 Democratic Primary with 3,106 votes (35.8%) in a field which included Representative Bob Herkes, and won the November 6, 2012 General election with 10,487 votes (71.5%) against Republican nominee Daryl Smith.

References

External links
Official page at the Hawaii State Legislature
Campaign site
 

Place of birth missing (living people)
Year of birth missing (living people)
Living people
Democratic Party Hawaii state senators
Eberly College of Science alumni
21st-century American politicians
Jewish American state legislators in Hawaii
21st-century American Jews